The Heiligendamm process is an initiative that will institutionalize high-level dialogue between the G8 and the five most important emerging economies, known as the O5 (Outreach 5): China, Mexico, India, Brazil and South Africa. The framework will also seek establishment of a common G8/G5 platform at the OECD.

In the past, talks between the two groups took place sporadically, but presently the G8 and O5 meet regularly. Innovation, freedom of investment, development in Africa, and technology for reducing  emissions were the four main issues this process visited in 2008 and 2009. A progress report was presented at the 2008 G8 Summit in Japan; a final report on the results of the dialogue was put forward in Italy in 2009. German Chancellor Angela Merkel supported this process, stating, "[W]e cannot get by, or shape globalization in a humane way, without each other".

On August 28, 2007, French President Nicolas Sarkozy proposed that China, Mexico, Brazil, South Africa and India should become members of G8: "The G8 can't meet for two days and the G13 for just two hours.... That doesn't seem fitting, given the power of these five emerging countries." Nevertheless, as of 2009 formal enlargement of the G8 is not a realistic political option, as G8 states have diverging positions thereon. The US and Japan have been against enlargement, with Great Britain and France actively in favour, and Italy, Germany, and Canada undecided.

References

 German Federal Government - The Heiligendamm Process

G7 summits